The Embassy of France in Tunis is France's diplomatic mission to Tunisia.

History

At the time, there were few buildings outside of the old city's walls. The new building replaced the older French consulate building inside the Medina, which as of 2017 was still extant albeit in disrepair.

Following the French conquest of Tunisia in 1881, the complex became the seat of the resident-general, the de facto governor of the French protectorate of Tunisia. In the 1890s, the Catholic Cathedral of Saint Vincent de Paul was built across the thoroughfare (now Avenue Habib Bourguiba) from the Residency. In 1904, the two pavilions flanking the entrance were rebuilt on a larger scale, after which the compound's layout has remained largely unchanged.

Following Tunisian independence in 1956, it was repurposed as the Chancery of the newly established embassy.

See also
 People's Palace (Algiers), former residence of the French Governor-General in Algeria
 French Protectorate Residence, Rabat
 List of French residents-general in Tunisia
 History of Tunisia under French rule
 France–Tunisia relations

Notes

Tunis
France
France–Tunisia relations